Bistrik-Crkvenjak is a village in the municipality of Kakanj, Federation of Bosnia and Herzegovina, Bosnia and Herzegovina.

History 
Before 1991, the village was attached to the locality of Haljinići; since 1991, it has been listed as an administrative entity in its own right.

Demographics 
According to the 2013 census, its population was 207.

References

Populated places in Kakanj
Villages in the Federation of Bosnia and Herzegovina